This is a list of notable writers who are Indigenous peoples of the Americas.

This list includes authors who are Alaskan Native, American Indian, First Nations, Inuit, Métis, and Indigenous peoples of Mexico, the Caribbean, Central America, and South America, as defined by the citizens of these Indigenous nations and tribes.

While Indigenous identity can at times be complex, inclusion in this list is based upon reliably-sourced citizenship in an Indigenous nation, based upon the legal definitions of, and recognition by, the relevant Indigenous community claimed by the individual. They must be documented as being claimed by that community. Writers such as Forrest Carter, Ward Churchill, Jamake Highwater, Joseph Boyden and Grey Owl, whose claims of Indigenous American descent have been factually disproved through genealogical research, are not included in this list.

A

 Louise Abeita, Isleta Pueblo, 1926–2014
 Janice Acoose, Sakimay (Saulteaux) First Nation-Métis, Canada, 1954–2020
 Evan Adams, Sliammon First Nation Coast Salish, Canada, b. 1966
 Howard Adams, Métis, Canada, 1921–2001
 Freda Ahenakew, Ahtahkakoop Cree, Canada, 1932–2011
 Humberto Ak'ab'al, K'iche' Maya, Guatemala, 1952–2019
 Kateri Akiwenzie-Damm, Nawash Chippewa, Canada, b. 1965
 Clarence Alexander, Gwichyaa Zhee Corporation Gwich’in, b. 1939
 Robert Arthur Alexie, Gwich'in, Canada, 1957–2014
 Sherman Alexie, Spokane/Coeur d'Alene, b. 1966
 Gerald Taiaiake Alfred, Kahnawake Mohawk, Canada, b. 1964
 Elsie Allen, Cloverdale Pomo, 1899–1990
 Paula Gunn Allen, Laguna/Sioux/Lebanese, 1939–2008
 Fernando de Alva Cortés Ixtlilxochitl, Texcocan, Mexico, ca. 1570–1648
 Irma Alvarez Ccoscco, Quechua, Peru, b. 1980
 Arthur Amiotte, Oglala Lakota, b. 1942
 Ch'aska Anka Ninawaman, Quechua, Peru, b. 1973
 William Apess, Pequot, 1798–1839
 Annette Arkeketa, Otoe-Missouria/Muscogee
 Jeannette C. Armstrong, Penticton Indian Band (Okanagan), Canada, b. 1948
 José María Arguedas, Mestizo of Quechua-descent, Peru, 1911–1969
 Joan Tavares Avant, Mashpee Wampanoag, b. 1940

B

 Joséphine Bacon, Innu, Québec, Canada, b.1947
 Marie Annharte Baker, Little Saskatchewan Ojibway, Canada, b. 1942
 Dennis Banks, Leech Lake Ojibwe, 1937–2017
 Keith Barker, Métis, Canada
 Jim Barnes, Choctaw Nation descent, b. 1933, Poet Laureate of Oklahoma, 2009
 Jose Barreiro, Taíno, Cuban-American, b. 1948
 James Bartleman, Chippewas of Rama First Nation, Canada, b. 1939
 Glecia Bear, Cree, Canada, 1912–1998
 Shane Belcourt, Métis, Canada, b. 1972
 Diane E. Benson, Tlingit, b. 1954
 Gertrude Bernard (Anahareo), Mohawk, Canada, 1906–1986
 Gloria Bird, Spokane, b. 1951
 Sandra Birdsell, Métis, Canada, b. 1942
 Andrew Blackbird, Odawa, ca. 1815–1908
 Ned Blackhawk, Te-Moak Shoshone
 Governor Blacksnake (Thaonawyuthe/Chainbreaker), Seneca, c. 1760–1859
 Peter Blue Cloud, Mohawk, 1935–2011
 Buffalo Bird Woman (Maxidiwiac), Hidatsa, ca. 1839–1932
 Sherwin Bitsui, Navajo, b. 1975
 Kimberly M. Blaeser, White Earth Ojibwe, b. 1955
 Peter Blue Cloud, Mohawk, b. 1935
 Columpa Bobb, Tsleil Waututh/Nlaka'pamux, Canada, b. 1971
 Elias Boudinot, Cherokee, 1740–1821, first Native American novelist (Poor Sarah, 1823)
 Beth Brant, Bay of Quinte Mohawk, 1941–2015
 Mary Brave Bird, Sicangu Lakota, 1953–2013
 Ignatia Broker, Ottertail Pillager Band Ojibwe, United States, 1919–1987
 Emily Ticasuk Ivanoff Brown, Inuk, (1904–1982)
 Vee F. Browne, Navajo, b. 1956
 Joseph Bruchac, Nulhegan Band, b. 1942
 Louis F. Burns (Hulah Hihekah), Osage Nation, 1920–2012
 Frank Christopher Busch, Cree, Canada

C

 Gregory Cajete, Santa Clara Pueblo
 Cristina Calderón, Yaghan, Chile, 1928–2022, last speaker of the Yaghan language
 Victoria Belcourt Callihoo (1861-1966) Métis historian
 Adela Calva Reyes, Otomí, Mexico, 1967-2018
 Maria Campbell, Métis, Canada, b. 1940
 Nicola Campbell, Interior Salish Nleʔkepmx, Canada
 Rob Capriccioso, Sault Ste. Marie Chippewa
 Harold Cardinal, Cree, 1945–2005
 Pedro Cayuqueo, Mapuche, Chile, b. 1975
 Aaron Albert Carr, Laguna Pueblo/Navajo, b. 1963
 Marisol Ceh Moo, Maya, Mexico, b. 1968
 Lorna Dee Cervantes, Chicana/Chumash-descent, United States, b. 1954
 Betsey Guppy Chamberlain, Wabanaki, ca. 1797–1886
 Dean Chavers, Lumbee, b. 1942
 Shirley Cheechoo, Cree, Canada, b. 1952
 Elicura Chihuailaf Nahuelpán, Mapuche, Chile
 Chrystos, Menominee-descent, b. 1946
 Eddie Chuculate, Muscogee/Cherokee, b. 1978
 Marie Clements, Métis, Canada, b. 1962
 Susan Clements, Seneca/Mohawk-descent, United States, b. 1950
 George Clutesi, Tseshaht First Nation, Canada, 1905–1988
 Jacinto Collahuazo, Quechua, Ecuador
 Thomas Commuck, Narragansett, 1805–1855
 Robert J. Conley, Cherokee Nation, 1940–2014
 Pascual Coña, Mapuche, Chile, late 1840s–1927
 Ivonne Coñuecar, Mapuche, Chile, b. 1980
 Elizabeth Cook-Lynn, Crow Creek Lakota, b. 1930
 Linda Coombs, Aquinnah Wampanoag
 George Copway, Mississauga Ojibwa, Canada, 1818–1869
 Jesse Cornplanter, Seneca, 1889–1957
 Rupert Costo, Cahuilla, 1906–1989
 Leonard Crow Dog, Oglala Lakota, 1942–2021
 Briceida Cuevas, Maya, Mexico, b. 1969
 David Cusick, Seneca, ca. 1780–ca. 1831

D

 Joseph A. Dandurand, Kwantlen First Nation, Canada
 Nora Marks Dauenhauer, Tlingit, 1927–2017
 Garcilaso de la Vega, 1539–1616, Mestizo/Quechua descent, Peru
 Nora Thompson Dean, Touching Leaves Woman, Delaware Tribe of Indians, 1907–1984
 Philip J. Deloria, Standing Rock Sioux Tribe
 Ella Cara Deloria, Yankton Dakota/Standing Rock Sioux, 1889–1971
 Vine Deloria, Jr., Yankton Dakota/Standing Rock Sioux, 1933–2005
 Bonnie Devine, Serpent River First Nation, Canada
 Cherie Dimaline, Métis, Canada
 Edward Dozier, Santa Clara Pueblo, 1916–1971
 Dawn Dumont, Okanese First Nation, Canada, b. 1973/1974

E

 Charles Eastman (Hakadah, Ohiyesa), Santee Dakota, 1858–1939
 Tommy Enuaraq, Inuk, Canada
Heid E. Erdrich, Turtle Mountain Ojibwe, b. 1963
 Louise Erdrich, Turtle Mountain Ojibwe, b. 1954

F

 Stephanie Fielding, Mohegan
 Connie Fife, Cree
 Waawaate Fobister, Grassy Meadows First Nation Anishinaabe, Canada
 Naomi Fontaine, Innu, Canada
 Natasha Kanapé Fontaine, Innu, Canada
 Lee Francis III, Laguna Pueblo/Anishinaabe, 1945–2003
 Vera Francis, Passamaquoddy, b. 1958
 L. Frank, Tongva/Acjachemen-descent
 Alice Masak French, Inuk, Canada, 1930–2013

G

 Eric Gansworth, Onondaga
 Garcilaso de la Vega (El Inca), Quechua, Peru, 1539–1616, first published in 1609
 Andrew George, Jr., Wet'suwet'en First Nation, Canada b. 1963
 Janice Gould, Maidu/Koyangk'auwi, 1949–2019
 George R. D. Goulet, Métis, Canada, b. 1933
 Fred Grove, Osage Nation/Oglala Lakota, 1913–2008
 Felipe Guaman Poma de Ayala, Quechua, Peru, ca. 1535–after 1616

H

 Janet Campbell Hale, Coeur d'Alene-Kootenay, 1946–2021
 Terri Crawford Hansen, Winnebago Tribe of Nebraska, b. 1953
 Ann Meekitjuk Hanson, Inuk, Canada, b. 1946
 Joy Harjo, Mvskoke, b. 1951
 Suzan Shown Harjo, Mvskoke/Southern Cheyenne
 LaDonna Harris, Comanche
 Ernestine Hayes, Tlingit, b. 1945
 Dakota Ray Hebert, Dene
 James (Sakej) Youngblood Henderson, Chickasaw/Cheyenne, b. 1944
 Gordon Henry, White Earth Ojibwe, b. 1955
 Natalio Hernández, Nahua, Mexico, b. 1947
 Hen-Toh (Bertrand N. O. Walker), Wyandotte, 1870–1927
 Vi Hilbert, Upper Skagit, 1918–2008
 Carol Anne Hilton Hesquiaht/Nuu-chah-nulth, Canada
 Tomson Highway, Cree, Canada, b. 1951
 Linda Hogan, Chickasaw Nation, b. 1947
 Andrew Hope III, Tlingit, 1949–2008
 John Christian Hopkins, Narragansett, b. 1960
 George Horse-Capture, Gros Ventre, 1937–2013
 Robert Houle, Saulteaux, Canada, b. 1947
 LeAnne Howe, Choctaw Nation of Oklahoma, b. 1951
 Ralph Hubbard, Seneca, 1885–1980
 Graciela Huinao, Huilliche, Chile, b. 1956
 Beverly Hungry Wolf, Blackfoot Confederacy, Canada, b. 1950
 Al Hunter, Rainy River Ojibwe, Canada

I

 Alootook Ipellie, Inuk, Canada, 1951–2007
 Peter Irniq, Inuk, Canada, b. 1947
 Madeline Ivalu, Inuk, Canada

J

 Paulla Dove Jennings, Narragansett
 Rita Joe, Mi'kmaq, Canada, 1932–2007
 Emily Pauline Johnson (Tekahionwake), Mohawk, Canada, 1861–1913
 Aviaq Johnston, Inuk, Canada
 Basil H. Johnston, Wasauksing Ojibway, Canada, 1929–2015
 Stephen Graham Jones, Blackfeet Tribe, b. 1972
 William Jones, Sac and Fox Nation, 1871–1909
 Edith Josie, Gwich'in, Canada, 1921–2010
 Hugo Jamioy Juagibioy, Kamentsa, Colombia
 Daniel Heath Justice, Cherokee Nation, Canada

K

 Peter Kalifornsky, Dena'ina, 1911–1993
 Joan Kane, Iñupiaq
 Margo Kane, Cree/Saulteaux, Canada, b. 1951
 An Antane-Kapesh, Innu, Québec, Canada, 1926-2004
Jacqueline Keeler, Navajo/Yankton Dakota
 Maude Kegg, Mille Lacs Ojibwe, 1904–1999
 William Kennedy, Métis, Canada, 1814–1890
 Maurice Kenny, Mohawk, 1929–2016
 Robin Wall Kimmerer, Citizen Potawatomi Nation, b. 1953
 Michael Kusugak, Inuk, Canada, b. 1948
 J. D. Kurtness, Innu, Québec, Canada, b. 1981

L

 Francis La Flesche, Omaha/Ponca, 1857–1932
 Susette La Flesche, Omaha/Ponca, 1854–1903
 Winona LaDuke, White Earth Ojibwe, b. 1959
 Carole LaFavor, Ojibwe
 Joseph Laurent, Abenaki, 1839–1917 
 Ronald G. Lewis, Cherokee Nation, b. 1941
 Georgina Lightning, Sampson First Nation Cree, Canada
 Darcie Little Badger, Lipan Apache, b. 1987
 William Harjo LoneFight, Muscogee/Natchez, b. 1966
 Donna M. Loring, Penobscot, b. 1948
 Kevin Loring, Nlaka'pamux, Canada Canada
 Adrian C. Louis, Lovelock Paiute, 1946–2018
 Phil Lucas, Choctaw Nation of Oklahoma, 1942–2007
 Henrik Lund, Kalaaleq, Greenland, 1875–1948

M

 Terese Marie Mailhot, Nlaka'pamux, Canada
 Wilma Mankiller, Cherokee Nation, 1945–2010
 Larry Spotted Crow Mann, Nipmuc
 Vera Manuel, Secwepemc, Canada/Ktunaxa, 1949–2010
 Lee Maracle, Salish/Cree, Canada, 1950–2021
 Joseph M. Marshall III, Brulé Lakota, b. ca. 1946
 Henry Lorne Masta, Abenaki, 1853–unknown
 John Joseph Mathews, Osage, ca. 1894–1979
 Gerald McMaster, Siksika Nation/Red Pheasant First Nation, Canada, b. 1953
 William D'Arcy McNickle, Salish Kootenai, 1904–1977
 Joe Medicine Crow, Crow, 1913–2016
 Rigoberta Menchú, K'iché Maya, Guatemala, b. 1959
 Billy Merasty, Cree, Canada, b. 1960
 Edmund Metatawabin, Cree, Canada
 Tiffany Midge, Hunkpapa Lakota, b. 1965
 Dylan Miner, Métis-descent, Canada-United States, b. 1976
 Devon Mihesuah, Choctaw Nation, b. 1957
 Deborah A. Miranda, Esselen/Chumash
 Gabriela Mistral, Diaguita, Chile, 1889–1957
 Lewis Mitchell, Passamaquoddy, 1847–1930
 N. Scott Momaday, Kiowa Tribe of Oklahoma, b. 1934
 Carlos Montezuma, Yavapai, 1866–1923
 Patricia Monture-Angus, Mohawk, Canada
 Irvin Morris, Navajo, b. 1958
 Daniel David Moses, Delaware, Canada, 1952–2020
 Mountain Wolf Woman, Ho-Chunk, 1884–1960
 Mourning Dove, Colville-Okanagan, 1888–1936
 Daniel Munduruku, Munduruku, Brazil, b. 1964
 Neddiel Muñoz Millalonco, Mapuche, Chile

N

 Mitiarjuk Nappaaluk, Inuk, Canada
 Nora Naranjo Morse, Santa Clara Pueblo, b. 1953
 David Neel, Kwakwaka'wakw, Canada, b. 1960
 Duane Niatum, Klallam, b. 1938
 Mildred Noble, Naotkamegwanning Ojibway, Canada and United States, 1921–2008
 Jim Northrup (Chibenashi), Fond du Lac Ojibwe, United States, 1943–2016
 nila northSun, Shoshone/Red Lake Ojibwe, b. 1951

O

 Jean O'Brien, White Earth Ojibwe, b. 1958 
 Samson Occom, Mohegan, 1723–1792, the first Native American known to publish in English
 Louis Oliver (Little Coon or Wotkoce Okisce), 1904–1991, Muscogee, poet
 Orpingalik, Netsilik Inuk, Canada
 Simon J. Ortiz, Acoma Pueblo, b. 1941

P

 Aaron Paquette, Métis, Canada
 Arthur C. Parker, Seneca, 1881–1955
 Daniel N. Paul, Mi'kmaq, Canada, b. 1938
 Mihku Paul, Kingsclear First Nation Maliseet, Canada, b. 1958
 Elise Paschen, Osage Nation
 Markoosie Patsauq, Inuk, Canada
 William S. Penn, Nez Perce, b. 1949
 Robert L. Perea, Oglala Lakota-/Mexican, United States
 Keewaydinoquay Peschel, Anishinaabe, 1919–1999
 Paula Peters, Wampanoag
 Lawrence "Pun" Plamondon", Grand Traverse Odawa-Ojibwe, b. 1946
 Peter Pitseolak, Cape Dorset Inuk, Canada, 1902–1973
 Simon Pokagon, Pokagon Potawatomi, ca. 1830–1899
 Marie Mason Potts, Mountain Maidu, United States, 1895–1978
 Alexander Posey, Muscogee (Creek) Nation, 1873–1908
 Susan Power, Standing Rock Sioux, b. 1961
 Pretty-Shield, Crow Nation, 1856–1944

Q

 Rachel Qitsualik-Tinsley, Inuk, Canada
 Quesalid, Kwakwaka'wakw, Canada
 Taamusi Qumaq, Inuk, Canada, 1914-1993

R

 Anselmo Raguileo Lincopil, Mapuche, Chile, 1922–1992
 Chief Henry Red Eagle, (Henry Perley), Maliseet, 1885–1972
 Delphine Red Shirt, Oglala Lakota, b. 1957
 Duke Redbird, Saugeen Ojibwe, Canada, b. 1939
 Bill Reid, Haida, Canada, 1920–1998
 Carter Revard, Osage Nation, 1931–2022
 Lawney Reyes, Confederated Colville Tribes (Sinixt), b. 1951
 Waubgeshig Rice, Wasauksing Ojibwe, Canada
 Lynn Riggs, Cherokee, United States, 1899–1954
 Silvia Rivera Cusicanqui, Aymara, Bolivia, b. 1949
 David A. Robertson, Cree, Canada, b. 1977
 Eden Robinson, Haisla/Heiltsuk, Canada, b. 1968
 Henry Roe Cloud, Winnebago Tribe of Nebraska, 1884–1950
 John Rollin Ridge (Yellow Bird), Cherokee, 1827–1867
 Will Rogers, Cherokee, 1879–1935
 Will Rogers, Jr., Cherokee Nation, 1911–1993
 Wendy Rose, Hopi/Miwok, b. 1948
 Ian Ross, Métis, Canada, b. 1960
 Armand Garnet Ruffo, Chapleau Ojibwe, Canada, b. 1955
 Steve Russell, Cherokee Nation, 1947–2021

S

 Ray St. Germain, Métis, Canada
 Carol Lee Sanchez, Laguna Pueblo
 William Sanders, Cherokee Nation, 1942–2017
 Greg Sarris, Federated Indians of Graton Rancheria, b. 1952
 Cheryl Savageau, Abenaki, b. 1950
 Madeline Sayet, Mohegan, b. 1989
 Katherine Siva Saubel, Los Coyotes Cahuilla, 1920–2011
 Gregory Scofield, Métis, Canada, b. 1966
 Jane Johnston Schoolcraft, Sault Ste. Marie Ojibwe, 1800–1841, first Native woman to publish
 Bev Sellars, Xat'sull, Canada
 James Sewid, Kwakwaka'wakw, Canada, 1913–1988
 María Clara Sharupi Jua, Shuar, Ecuador, b. 1964
 Charles Norman Shay, Penobscot, b. 1924
 Paula Sherman, Ardoch Algonquin First Nation, Canada
 Kim Shuck, Cherokee Nation
 Angela Sidney, Tagish, Canada, 1902–1991
 Leslie Marmon Silko, Laguna Pueblo, b. 1948
 Leanne Betasamosake Simpson, Alderville First Nation, Canada 
 Jocelyn Sioui, Huron-Wendat Nation, Québec, Canada
 Ruby Slipperjack, Eabametoong Ojibwe, Canada, b. 1952
 Cynthia Leitich Smith, Muscogee Creek, b. 1967
 Monique Gray Smith, Cree/Lakota, Canada
 Paul Chaat Smith, Comanche/Choctaw
 Virginia Driving Hawk Sneve, Brulé Lakota, b. 1933
 Donald Soctomah, Passamaquoddy
 Loren Spears, Narragansett
 Luther Standing Bear, Oglala Lakota, ca. 1868–1939
 James Thomas Stevens, Akwesasne Mohawk,  b. 1966
 Virginia Stroud, United Keetoowah Band Cherokee/Muscogee, b. 1951
 Madonna Swan, Cheyenne River Lakota, 1928–1993
 Denise Sweet, White Earth Ojibwe, Poet Laureate of Wisconsin 2004
 James Schoppert, Tlingit, 1947–1992

T

 Margo Tamez, Lipan Apache/Jumano Apache, b. 1962
 Gladys Tantaquidgeon, Mohegan, 1899–2005
 Luci Tapahonso, Navajo, b. 1953
 Drew Hayden Taylor, Ojibwe, Canada, b. 1962
 Ningeokuluk Teevee, Cape Dorset Inuk, Canada, b. 1963
 Clayton Thomas-Müller, Cree, Canada
 Lucy Thompson, Yurok 1853–1932, first indigenous Californian woman to be published
 Russell Thornton, Cherokee Nation, b. 1942
 Shannon Thunderbird, Tsimshian First Nation, Canada
 Susette LaFlesche Tibbles, Omaha/Ponca/Iowa, 1854–1903
 George Tinker, Osage Nation
 Natalia Toledo, Zapotec, Mexico, b. 1968
 Gail Tremblay, Mi'kmaq/Onondaga, b. 1945
 Raymond D. Tremblay, Métis, Canada
 David Treuer, Leech Lake Ojibwe, b. 1970
 John Trudell, Santee Dakota, 1946–2015
 Demetrio Túpac Yupanqui, Quechua, Peru, 1923–2018
 Mark Turcotte, Turtle Mountain Chippewa
 Richard Twiss, Brulé Lakota, 1954–2013
 Arielle Twist, Cree
 E. Donald Two-Rivers, Anishinaabe, 1945–2008

 Froyla Tzalam, Mopan Maya, Belize

U

 Uvavnuk, Iglulik Inuk, Canada

V

 Richard Van Camp, Tli Cho, Canada, b. 1971
 Gerald Vizenor, White Earth Ojibwe, b. 1934

W

 Richard Wagamese, Ojibwe, Canada
 Bertrand N. O. Walker (Hen-Toh), Wyandotte, 1870–1927
 Velma Wallis, Athabaskan, b. 1960
 Juan Wallparrimachi, Quechua, Bolivia, 1793–1814
 Anna Lee Walters, Pawnee/Otoe-Missouria, b. 1946
 William Whipple Warren, Ojibwe, 1825–1853
 Clyde Warrior, Ponca, 1939–1968
 Waziyatawin (Angela Wilson), Wahpetunwan Dakota
 Matthew James Weigel, Denesuline/Métis
 James Welch, Blackfeet/Gros Ventre, 1940–2003
 Gwen Westerman, Sisseton-Wahpeton Dakota Oyate /Cherokee Nation
 Tom Whitecloud, Lac du Flambeau Ojibwe, 1914–1972
 Mary Louise Defender Wilson, Dakota/Hidatsa, b. 1930
 Sarah Winnemucca (Thocmentony), Northern Paiute, ca. 1844–1891
 Elizabeth Woody, Navajo/Wasco-Wishram, b. 1957
 Muriel Hazel Wright, Choctaw Nation, 1889–1975

Y

 William S. Yellow Robe, Jr., Fort Peck Assiniboine, 1962–2021
 Annie York, Spuzzum First Nation Nlaka'pamux, Canada, 1904–1991
 Ray Young Bear, Meskwaki, b. 1950
 Alfred Young Man, Chippewa-Cree, Canada and United States, b. 1948

Z

 Ofelia Zepeda, Tohono O'odham, b. 1952
 Zitkala-Sa (Gertrude Simmons Bonnin), Yankton Dakota-Standing Rock Sioux, 1876–1938
 Melissa Tantaquidgeon Zobel, Mohegan, b. 1960

See also

 :Category:Indigenous Australian writers
 :Category:Native American writers
 Before Columbus Foundation
 List of 20th-century writers
 List of indigenous artists of the Americas
 Multi-Ethnic Literature of the United States
 Native American Renaissance
 Native Americans in children's literature
 Native Writers' Circle of the Americas
 Navajo Community College Press

References

Bibliography

External links

 Association for the Study of American Indian Literatures
 NativeWiki literature pages
 Associated Press/CNN.com: Reading into Native American Writers
 Storytellers: Native American Authors Online.
 Yax Te' Books catalog, publishing house for Mayan literature in Mayan, Spanish and English.

 
Indigenous
 
 
Indigenous
Writers
Lists of Native American people
Lists of Canadian writers